Dog & Bone is an Australian-based consumer electronics accessory company that sells mobile protection products. Their products include protective smartphone cases for iOS and Android devices, smartphone charging cases, and a line of Bluetooth-connected padlocks.

History 

Lee Ranchod and Maria Ranchod established Dog & Bone in 2012. In 2013, the company released the world's first topless direct touchscreen waterproof smartphone case, the patented Wetsuit. In January 2014, the company announced a wireless charging smartphone case with a replaceable battery module at the International Consumer Electronics Show (CES) in Las Vegas, the Backbone Wireless Charging Case. The Backbone was awarded a Good Design Award in May 2014 in the Consumer Electronics category.

At International CES in 2015, Dog & Bone previewed the first patented keyless Bluetooth padlock, the LockSmart, to the public. In early 2015, the company acquired a capital raising of AUD $2.0 million by way of a convertible note to private investors. In 2016, Dog & Bone announced a TSA-approved, Bluetooth connected luggage lock at the International CES in Las Vegas.

Products 

The Wetsuit Impact Case is a waterproof and drop proof case featuring a 9H flexible glass impact screen protector.

The Backbone Wireless Charging Case is a shockproof wireless charging case.

The LockSmart and LockSmart Mini are keyless Bluetooth connected padlocks.

The Wetsuit Case is the first waterproof, topless direct touchscreen smartphone case with Touch ID compatibility.

The Bone Guard is a thin (0.2mm) screen protector.

The LockSmart Travel is a U.S. Transportation Security Administration-approved, Bluetooth connected luggage lock and associated app.

References 

Electronics companies of Australia